The FIL European Luge Championships 1982 took place in Winterberg, West Germany.

Men's singles

Women's singles

Men's doubles

Medal table

References
Men's doubles European champions
Men's singles European champions
Women's singles European champions

FIL European Luge Championships
1982 in luge
Luge in Germany
1982 in German sport